City University Malaysia is a private university established in Selangor, Malaysia in April 1984.

City University is accredited by the Malaysian Qualifications Agency. Under a Sino-Malaysian bilateral agreement in 2009, City University's degrees are acknowledged by the Chinese Ministry of Education.

According to the Malaysian government's official SETARA ratings of Malaysian universities, CityU is rated as 4-Star or "Very Good".

City University Press publishes the CUeJAR, a double-blind peer reviewed quarterly international open access e-journal.  As a research university, CityU offers five MQA-accredited doctoral programs in the fields of business, information technology, design, and education.

Faculties and departments 
The academic faculties at CityU are:
City Graduate School
Centre of Foundation Studies
Faculty of Art & Design
Faculty of Education & Liberal Studies
Faculty of Architecture & Built Environment 
Faculty of Business
Faculty of Allied Health Sciences
Faculty of Engineering 
Faculty of Hospitality & Tourism
Faculty of Information Technology
Faculty of Creative Industries

Partnerships

Academic partners
CityU's international academic partners include University of Central Oklahoma, Beijing Normal University, Vatel, Anglia Ruskin University and Southern Cross University. It partners with Jinan University to form an international think tank on Sino-Malaysian cooperation under the Belt and Road Initiative.

International academic collaborations
CityU had collaborated with overseas universities to offer joint degree programmes in Malaysia, including:
Bachelor's in Hospitality Management with Vatel

Vatel's campus in Malaysia
Vatel international business school launched its campus in CityU in 2017. CityU and Vatel jointly launched a degree programme in hospitality management on their Malaysian campus.

References

External links
 

 
Private universities and colleges in Malaysia
Educational institutions established in 1984
1984 establishments in Malaysia
Agricultural universities and colleges in Malaysia
Business schools in Malaysia
Design schools in Malaysia
Engineering universities and colleges in Malaysia
Information technology schools in Malaysia
Medical schools in Malaysia
Nursing schools in Malaysia